Quartier is a village in the Aquin commune of the Aquin Arrondissement, in the Sud department of Haiti.

The village is located 2 miles northeast of Aquin on Route Nationale #2.

References

Populated places in Sud (department)